Rock Odyssey is an animated feature film produced by Hanna-Barbera for a television release in 1987.
Directed by Robert Taylor (but credited to William Hanna and Joseph Barbera on the final print), with storyboards by Pete Alvarado.

Plot
The story of a mysterious female teen idol named Laura, who embarks on a journey to find her true love. The movie's soundtrack is set to four decades of classic rock. Scatman Crothers provides the voice of a living jukebox who narrates the story.

Characters
The Jukebox: Scatman Crothers and Frank Welker (additional dialogue)
Laura (a.k.a. Peggy Sue)
Billy  (50's Love Interest)
Bob (60's Love Interest)
Jack (70's Love Interest)
True Love

Production notes
Production of Rock Odyssey began in 1981 at Hanna-Barbera's short-lived feature animation unit, as a follow-up project to Heidi's Song. It was intended as a prime-time TV special for ABC, and was mentioned in a fall 1981 H-B trade ad as being slated to air in the spring of 1982, but the project was shelved after executives at H-B and corporate parent Taft Entertainment saw the film's graphic imagery, particularly relating to the 1960s and the Vietnam War. (Subsequently, Robert Taylor left the studio, and H-B closed their feature animation unit, after the box-office failure of Heidi's Song.)

The program was shelved by Hanna-Barbera, who intended to retool the program; at a March 1983 Congressional hearing on children's television, ABC children's programming VP Squire Rushnell mentioned that it was slated to air that year. However, the film remained on the shelf until the mid-80s, at which time a new sequence was added, featuring classic Hanna-Barbera cartoon clips set to "Wake Me Up Before You Go-Go". This sequence was intended to bring the film "up to date", since the rest of the soundtrack only covered songs up to 1980. Hanna-Barbera and Worldvision Enterprises made Rock Odyssey available for international television distribution in 1987, and the film is mentioned in trade advertisements from that year. (Ironically, this final completed and released version seems to retain all of the "offensive" scenes which had led H-B to shelve the project back in the early 80s.)

Rock Odyssey has not yet been aired on TV, or released on VHS, DVD or Blu-ray in the United States by Warner Home Video, however, it was screened at the Second Los Angeles International Animation Celebration in July 1987. It has also aired on TV in Spain and several Latin American countries, with the narration dubbed into Spanish.

Despite all this, clips from the film were used for HBTV and a poster of Rock Odyssey can be seen in The Flintstones TV movie Hollyrock-a-Bye Baby.

In the fall of 2010, the film was aired (in English) on Boomerang Southeast Asia.

References

External links
 
 Rock Odyssey at the Big Cartoon Database
 Rock Odyessy Blog

1987 animated films
1987 films
1980s American animated films
Hanna-Barbera animated films
Hanna-Barbera television specials
Films directed by William Hanna
Films directed by Joseph Barbera
Films produced by William Hanna
Films produced by Joseph Barbera
Films scored by Hoyt Curtin
1980s English-language films